Salvatore Grippi (1921-2017) was an American artist and founder of the art department at Ithaca College.

Biography
Grippi was born in Buffalo, New York on September 30, 1921. He attended the Albright Art School and the Museum of Modern Art School. He served in the armed forces during World War II. Upon his return he studied at the Art Students League of New York and the Atelier 17 print studio. He was the recipient of a Fulbright scholarship which he used to study at the Istituto Statale d’Arte in Florence.

Grippi taught at several art schools including the Cooper Union Art School, the School of Visual Arts, and Pomona College. He founded the art department at Ithaca College.

He died on November 30, 2017 in Brewster, Massachusetts. 

Grippi's work is included in the collections of the Museum of Modern Art, the National Gallery of Art, and the Whitney Museum of American Art.

References

External links
images of Grippi's work on the Annex Galleries Fine Prints
images of Grippi's work on Invaluable

1921 births
2017 deaths 
20th-century American artists
Atelier 17 alumni
Art Students League of New York alumni
Pomona College faculty